Susanne Schröter (born 1957) is a contemporary Social Anthropologist focussing primarily on Islam, Gender and Conflict Studies.

Biography
Susanne Schröter is head of a research group on "Contemporary discourses on state and society in the Islamic world" and carries out a research project founded by the German Research Foundation (DFG) entitled "Re-negotiating gender in contemporary Indonesia. Empowerment strategies of Muslim and secular women activists".

1990s
Schröter studied Anthropology, Sociology, Cultural Studies, Political Science and Education at University of Mainz, Germany, she graduated in 1986 (M.A. summa cum laude).

After working as Curator at the Women's Museum, Wiesbaden from 1986 to 1990, she became lecturer at the Department of Anthropology and African Studies, University of Mainz (1991–1996). She was head of the anthropology library and ethnographic collection at the Department of Anthropology and African Studies, University of Mainz from 1993 to 1994. In 1994, she obtained her Ph.D. (magna cum laude) in Anthropology at the University of Mainz with a thesis on the construction of "masculinity" and "femininity" in Melanesia (Dissertation title: "Männliche Selbsterhaltungsstrategien angesichts der Vorstellung omnipotenter Weiblichkeit - Materialien zur Konstruktion von 'Männlichkeit' und 'Weiblichkeit' in Melanesien").
From 1995-1997, she was a Research Fellow at the Department of Anthropology and African Studies, University of Mainz. From 1997-1999, she worked as a Research Fellow at the Frobenius-Institute, Frankfurt. In 1999, she finalized her Habilitation ("Kéo rado - Die Austreibung des Bösen. Ein Beitrag zur Religion und Sozialstruktur der Ngada in Ostindonesien") and received accreditation as Privatdozentin at Goethe-University Frankfurt with a thesis on religion and social structure among the Ngada in East Indonesia. In 1999, she was a Visiting Professor of Anthropology at the Department of Anthropology and African Studies, University of Mainz.

2000s
In 2000, she worked as a Visiting Research Fellow at the Department of Anthropology, University of Chicago, and as a Visiting Professor at the Department of Anthropology, Yale University, New Haven. From 2001 to 2002, she was Visiting Professor of Anthropology at the Institute of Historical Ethnology, Goethe-University Frankfurt, and from 2002 to 2004 Research Fellow at the Frobenius Institute, Frankfurt. In 2003, she organized the conference "Christianity in Indonesia. Perspectives of Power" at Goethe-University Frankfurt (in Cooperation with Leiden University). In 2004, she worked as a Visiting Professor at the Doctoral Program "Identity and Difference: Gender Constructions and Interculturality, 18th-21st Centuries" at the University of Trier, as Associate Professor of Anthropology at Goethe-University Frankfurt. In 2004, she became Professor of Southeast Asian studies at Passau University, where she worked until 2008. In 2005, she organized the conference "Islam and Gender in Southeast Asia" at Passau University, Germany. Since 2008, she is Professor of Anthropology of colonial and postcolonial orders at the Cluster of Excellence "Formation of Normative Orders", Goethe-University Frankfurt (German Universities Excellence Initiative).

Schröter is member of the scientific advisory board of the Austrian Documentation Center for Political Islam.

Books
 The name of Islam (Im Namen des Islam) 
She has studied and criticized the behavior of the radical Muslim minority in Germany and the purpose of this group and has pointed out that she has written the behaviors and actions of this group in the name of Islam.

References

External links

 
 Susanne Schröter at the Institut für Ethnologie, Goethe University, Frankfurt

Professorships
 Formation of Normative Orders, Cluster of Excellence
 Institut für Ethnologie, Goethe-University, Frankfurt
 Frobenius-Institut, Goethe-University, Frankfurt
 Anthropology, University of Chicago
 Anthropology, Yale University

German anthropologists
German women anthropologists
Living people
Johannes Gutenberg University Mainz alumni
Academic staff of Johannes Gutenberg University Mainz
Academic staff of the University of Passau
1957 births